= Liberation Church =

Christian ministry in Virginia, US

Coordinates: 37°30′11″N 77°29′55″W

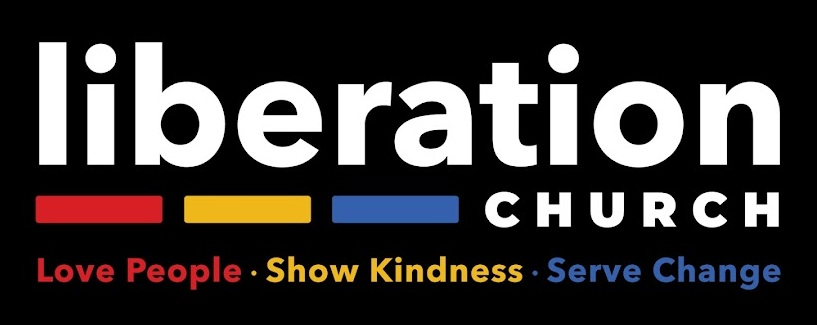
- Founded: 2009; 17 years ago
- Founders: Pastors Jay and Ashley Patrick
- Type: Independent, non-denominational Christian church
- Headquarters: 5501 Midlothian Turnpike, Richmond, Virginia 23225
- Official languages: English
- Website: liberationrva.org
- Formerly called: Celebration Church

Liberation Church is a non-denominational Christian ministry in Richmond, Virginia. It was founded in 2009 by Jay Patrick. The church is currently located at the old Celebration Church location on Midlothian Turnpike. Next to it is the Liberation Thrift Store which serves the Richmond area. Before Liberation, there were an additional two stores located on Nine Mile Rd. and Launderdale Dr.

== Liberation Center ==
Liberation Center will be a family resource center that will focus to reduce the incidence of child neglect & child abuse in Richmond. It is one of four in the state of Virginia to be created, which reflect on the Virginia General Assembly. It is planned to open at the church in the summer of 2023.

== Celebration Church & Outreach Ministry ==
The ministry was originally founded in 2001 by Pastor Geronimo Aguilar as Richmond Outreach Center. It was first located in a small warehouse near Pure Pleasure before moving to the current location.

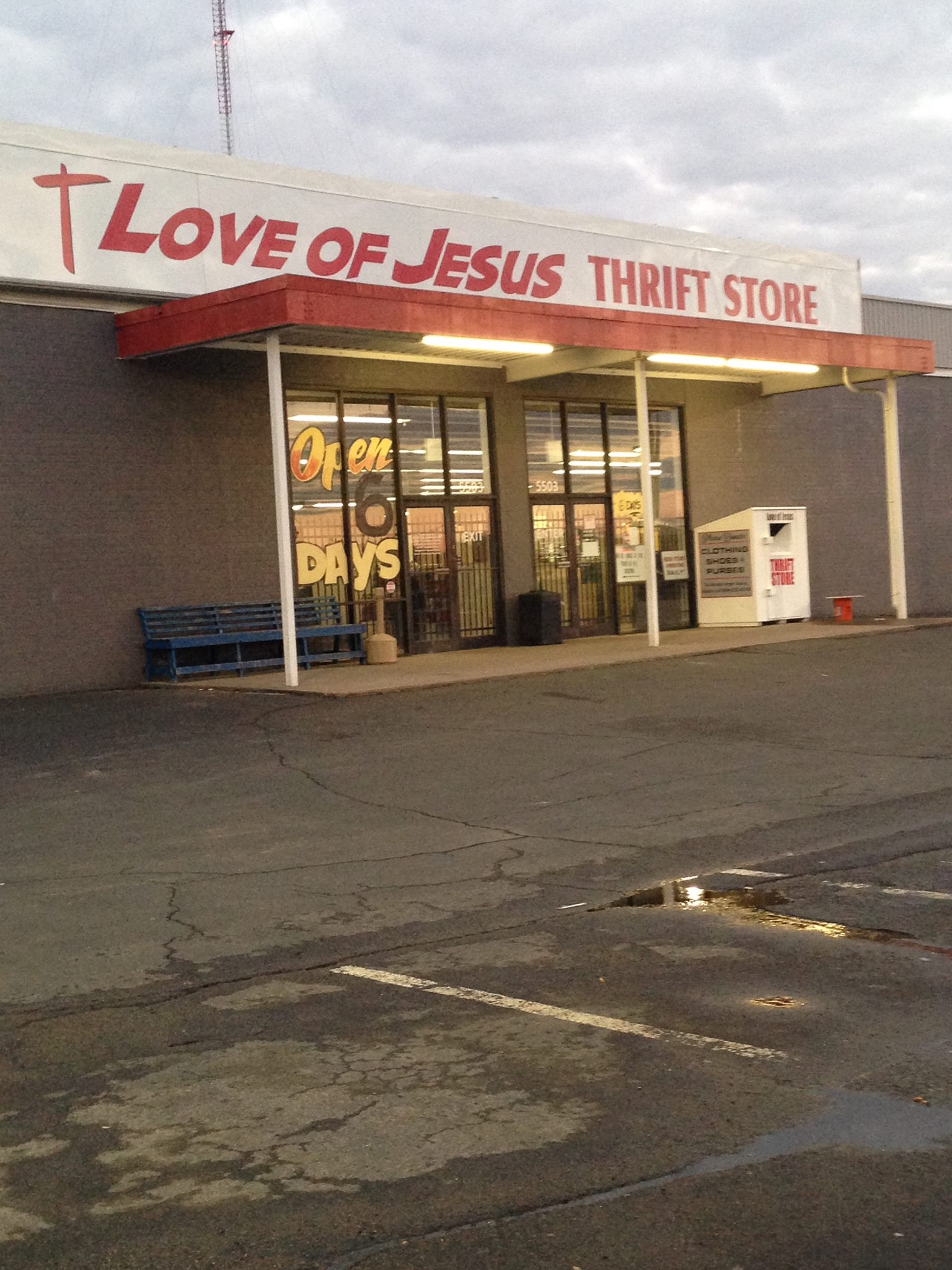
Storefront of Love of Jesus Thrift Store, which is now Liberation Thrift.

The church was renamed to Celebration Church & Outreach Ministry in 2015 after the former pastor was indicted on sexual assault charges against two girls in 2013. After this, church attendance declined significantly and there were many changes in pastors.

In April 2021, Pastors Jay and Ashley Patrick announced that Celebration Church's board of directors had gifted Liberation the property of Celebration Church debt-free. It included a 135,00 sq ft sanctuary, commercial workout facility, and a full service cafe. An additional property was also given for women who are suffering human trafficking and domestic violence. Before Liberation Church was gifted Celebration's property, Pastor Jay Patrick was already giving sermons at the location on Saturday evenings.
